Champion Broadband was a cable, Internet, and telephone provider in the United States. It previously operated in the Denver and Los Angeles markets along with smaller rural markets. 

In August 2014, it was announced that the internet and telephone services were acquired by Giggle Fiber. Cable TV services were not acquired and were still in operation by Champion Broadband. Both companies are still owned and run by Mark and Dave Haverkate.

References

External links
 Champion Broadband website (Site no longer active)
 Giggle Fiber website

Broadband
Cable television companies of the United States
Defunct companies based in Colorado
Mass media companies established in 2003